János Máté (born 23 December 1948) was a Hungarian professional footballer who played as a forward, later became a football coach. He was a member of the Hungarian national football team.

Career 
He started playing football in his hometown, Bonyhád. In 1968 he joined Pécsi MFC, where he scored 47 goals in five seasons. His first big success came on 4 November 1970 in the second leg of the European Cities Cup between Pécsi Dózsa and Newcastle United, where he scored both goals and won the second leg with 11 shots (5:2) in front of 22,000 spectators. János Máté joined the Hungarian national team in 1970. Three years later, he was playing for Ferencváros. In 1974, they won the Hungarian National Championship and qualified for the KEK. He scored four times in the cup competition: twice against Cardiff City F.C., twice against Liverpool F.C. and twice against Malmö. His goal in Liverpool meant qualification and was a major factor in Ferencváros's progress to the final, where they were eventually defeated by FC Dynamo Kyiv. In total, he played 93 matches for Fradi, of which 58 were league, 25 international and 10 domestic. Number of goals: 34 (14 league, 20 other).

After 1975 he played one season for Budapest Honvéd FC and two seasons for Kaposvár Rákóczi FC in the first division. He then played for Építők, finishing his active sports career in Dömsöd.

National team 
He played 7 times for the Hungarian national team between 1970 and 1975 and scored 2 goals.

As a coach 
From 1985 to 1994 he coached the Vácszentlászló football team.

Honours 

 Magyar Kupa (MNK)
 Winner: 1974
 European Cup Winners' Cup (ECC)
 Finalist: 1974-75

References 

Hungarian footballers
1948 births
Living people
Hungary international footballers
People from Bonyhád
Association football forwards
Hungarian football managers
Pécsi MFC players
Ferencvárosi TC footballers
Budapest Honvéd FC players
Kaposvári Rákóczi FC players
Nemzeti Bajnokság I players
Sportspeople from Tolna County